Arbutus is a planned underground station on the Millennium Line of Metro Vancouver's SkyTrain rapid transit system. It will be located at the northeast corner of the intersection of West Broadway and Arbutus Street in the Kitsilano neighbourhood of Vancouver, British Columbia, Canada, and will be the western terminus of the Millennium Line when completed. Originally scheduled to open in 2025, the station's projected opening was pushed back to early 2026 in November 2022.

The station will provide a connection to the Arbutus Greenway. Passengers continuing to the University of British Columbia (UBC) will have to transfer to a 99 B-Line bus to continue west along Broadway. As the planned new eastern terminus of the 99 B-Line, the station design includes a bus loop. There have been proposals to extend the Millennium Line all the way to UBC, but , funding for that proposal had not been committed. Federal funding was being discussed as of February 2021.

Station information

References

External links

Millennium Line stations
Railway stations scheduled to open in 2026
Buildings and structures in Vancouver
Proposed railway stations in Canada